Chongqing Zoo is a zoo in the city of Chongqing, China, about 8 km (5 miles) southwest from the city centre.

Overview
The zoo is located at Yangjiaping on Xijiao Road in the Jiulongpo District of Chongqing. It was built in 1953 and officially opened to the public in 1955. The zoo covers an area of 45 hectares (111 acres).

The zoo is an important base for the protection of and research on wild animals.
It exhibits rare species including giant pandas, red pandas, the very rare South China tiger and white tiger, and the African elephant.

The main entrance of the zoo is close to Zoo station on Line 2 of the Chongqing Rail Transit.

The zoo was previously accredited by the World Association of Zoos and Aquariums (WAZA).

Gallery

See also
 Zoo station
 List of zoos

References

External links

 Chongqing Zoo website 

Jiulongpo District
Buildings and structures completed in 1953
1955 establishments in China
Zoos established in 1955
Zoos in China
Zoo
Zoo